Basit (also Romanized as Basīţ) is a village in Almalu Rural District of Nazarkahrizi District, Hashtrud County, East Azerbaijan province, Iran. At the 2006 National Census, its population was 508 in 78 households. The following census in 2011 counted 528 people in 149 households. The latest census in 2016 showed a population of 599 people in 166 households; it was the largest village in its rural district.

References 

Hashtrud County

Populated places in East Azerbaijan Province

Populated places in Hashtrud County